Aphonus is a genus of rhinoceros beetles in the family Scarabaeidae. There are about six described species in Aphonus.

Species
These six species belong to the genus Aphonus:
 Aphonus brevicruris Cartwright, 1944
 Aphonus castaneus (Melsheimer, 1845)
 Aphonus densicauda Casey, 1915
 Aphonus texanus Gill & Howden, 1985
 Aphonus tridentatus (Say, 1823)
 Aphonus variolosus (LeConte, 1847)

References

Further reading

 
 
 
 

Dynastinae
Articles created by Qbugbot